Genoplesium commonly known as midge orchids, is a genus of about 50 species of flowering plants in the orchid family, Orchidaceae and is found in Australia, New Zealand and New Caledonia. Midge orchids are terrestrial herbs with a single leaf at the base of the plant. They are similar to orchids in the genus Prasophyllum in that plants without flowers have a hollow, onion-like leaf. The flowers are small but often scented and attractive to their insect pollinators. There is disagreement about which species belong to this genus and some taxonomists suggest that most belong in the genus Corunastylis.

Description
Orchids in the genus Genoplesium are terrestrial, perennial, deciduous, sympodial herbs, usually with a few inconspicuous, fine roots and a pair of more or less spherical tubers. The tubers are partly covered by a protective fibrous sheath which extends to the soil surface.  Replacement tubers form at the end of short root-like stolons. Orchids in this genus do not reproduce using "daughter" tubers, but rely on their flowers for reproduction. A single long, cylindrical, glabrous leaf develops near the base of the plant and is fused to the flowering stem. The leaf of flowering plants is solid but those of sterile plants are hollow.

The inflorescence is a spike or raceme with a few to many non-resupinate flowers which are often have reddish brown or purple parts and often smell fruity. The dorsal sepal is usually shorter and wider than two lateral sepals, dished on the lower surface and often forms a hood over the column. The lateral sepals are often joined near their bases and the lateral petals are shorter and narrower than the sepals. As is usual in orchids, one petal is highly modified as the central labellum, much different from the other petals and sepals. The labellum is above the column and joined to it by a flexible attachment, so that the labellum vibrates in a breeze. The edge of the labellum sometimes has fine teeth, glands or hairs. The labellum has a callus which consists often covers its surface and which consists of a raised, fleshy plate. The sexual parts of the flower are fused to the column which is short and has narrow wings, often with an extension at the front. Midge orchids usually flower in summer, autumn or winter, depending on species, and the fruit that follows flowering is a non-fleshy, dehiscent capsule containing up to 500 seeds.

Taxonomy and naming
The genus Genoplesium was first formally described by Robert Brown in 1810 and the description was published in Prodromus Florae Novae Hollandiae. The type species is G. baueri.

The name Genoplesium is derived from the Ancient Greek words genos meaning "race", "stock" or  "kind" and plesios meaning "near" referring to the similarity of these orchids to those in the genus Prasophyllum.

David Jones and Mark Clements proposed moving all but one species of Genoplesium to Corunastylis. The change has been accepted by the Royal Botanic Gardens Victoria who list eleven species of Corunastylis but not the Index Kewensis.

Distribution and habitat
Midge orchids mainly occur in Queensland, New South Wales, Victoria, Tasmania and South Australia. There is one species (G. calopterum) in New Caledonia and two (G. nudum and G. pumilum) in New Zealand. Most Genoplesium species occur in near-coastal regions but also grow in montane and sub-alpine areas. In Australia they are most common in moss beds over rock, in forest, woodland, heath and mallee. Genoplesium species in New Zealand grow in grassy places as well as in swamps and the New Caledonian species grows in stunted maquis.

Ecology
Some of the characteristics of the flowers of midge orchids, such as small size, dull colours and hairy parts waving in a breeze, suggest pollination by small flies. Some studies have suggested that the flowers are pollinated exclusively by flies of the Superfamily Chloropoidea (now in the Family Milichiidae). A few species, such as the New Zealand G. nudum appear to exclusively self-pollinate.

Species list
The species recognised by the World Checklist of Selected Plant Families as of July 2016 are:

Genoplesium acuminatum (R.S.Rogers) D.L.Jones & M.A.Clem. (NSW) – pointed midge orchid
Genoplesium alticola D.L.Jones & B.Gray (Qld) – tableland midge orchid
Genoplesium anthracinum (D.L.Jones) J.M.H. Shaw (NSW) – black midge orchid
Genoplesium apostasioides (Fitzg.) D.L.Jones & M.A.Clem. (NSW) – freak midge orchid
Genoplesium archeri (Hook.f.) D.L.Jones & M.A.Clem. (Vic, Tas, NSW, Qld) - elfin midge orchid 
Genoplesium arrectum D.L.Jones  (Vic, NSW, ACT) – erect midge orchid
Genoplesium baueri R.Br.  (NSW) – brittle midge orchid, yellow gnat orchid
Genoplesium bishopii D.L.Jones  (NSW) – Gibraltar Range midge orchid
Genoplesium brachystachyum  (Lindl.) D.L.Jones & M.A.Clem. (Tas) – short spike midge orchid
Genoplesium calopterum  (Rchb.f.) D.L.Jones & M.A.Clem. (New Caledonia)
Genoplesium citriodorum  D.L.Jones & M.A.Clem. (NSW) – lemon-scented midge orchid
Genoplesium clivicola  (D.L.Jones) J.M.H.Shaw (NSW, ACT)
Genoplesium confertum (D.L.Jones) D.L.Jones & M.A.Clem. (Qld) – crowded midge orchid
Genoplesium cornutum (D.L.Jones) J.M.H.Shaw (NSW, ACT)
Genoplesium cranei D.L.Jones  (Qld) – Blackall Ridge midge orchid
Genoplesium despectans (Hook.f.) D.L.Jones & M.A.Clem. (SA, Vic, Tas, NSW) – sharp midge orchid 
Genoplesium ectopum  D.L.Jones  (ACT) – Brindabella midge orchid 
Genoplesium eriochilum (Fitzg.) D.L.Jones & M.A.Clem. (NSW) – Mount Wilson midge orchid
Genoplesium filiforme (Fitzg.) D.L.Jones & M.A.Clem. (NSW, Qld) – glandular midge orchid
Genoplesium fimbriatum (R.Br.) D.L.Jones & M.A.Clem. (NSW, Qld) – fringed midge orchid
Genoplesium firthii  (L.Cady) D.L.Jones  (Tas) – Firth's midge orchid
Genoplesium formosum  D.L.Jones (NSW) – Cathcart midge orchid
Genoplesium insigne D.L.Jones  (NSW) – dark midge orchid
Genoplesium littorale  D.L.Jones  (NSW) – Tuncurry midge orchid
Genoplesium morinum  D.L.Jones  (Vic, NSW) – mulberry midge orchid
Genoplesium morrisii  (Nicholls) D.L.Jones & M.A.Clem. (SA, Vic, Tas, NSW) – bearded midge-orchid
Genoplesium nigricans (R.Br.) D.L.Jones & M.A.Clem. (SA) – mallee midge-orchid
Genoplesium nudiscapum (Hook.f.) D.L.Jones & M.A.Clem. (Tas) – dense midge-orchid
Genoplesium nudum  (Hook.f.) D.L.Jones & M.A.Clem. (NZ, Vic, Tas, NSW, ACT) – tiny midge orchid
Genoplesium oliganthum D.L.Jones  (NSW) – Mongarlowe midge orchid
Genoplesium ostrinum  D.L.Jones (NSW) – purple midge orchid
Genoplesium parvicallum (Rupp) D.L.Jones & M.A.Clem. (Qld) – mountain-top midge orchid
Genoplesium pedersonii D.L.Jones  (Qld) – Pederson's midge orchid
Genoplesium plumosum (Rupp) D.L.Jones & M.A.Clem. (NSW) – Tallong midge orchid or plumed midge orchid 
Genoplesium psammophilum D.L.Jones  (Qld) – coastal midge orchid
Genoplesium pumilum (Hook.f.) D.L.Jones & M.A.Clem. (NZ, Vic, Tas, NSW, Qld) – green midge orchid 
Genoplesium rhyoliticum  D.L.Jones & M.A.Clem. (NSW) – Pambula midge orchid
Genoplesium rufum  (R.Br.) D.L.Jones & M.A.Clem. (NSW, Qld) – rufous midge orchid
Genoplesium ruppii  (R.S.Rogers) D.L.Jones & M.A.Clem. (NSW) – Rupp's midge orchid
Genoplesium sagittiferum  (Rupp) D.L.Jones & M.A.Clem. (NSW) – horned midge orchid
Genoplesium sigmoideum D.L.Jones  (Qld) – Dave's Creek midge orchid
Genoplesium simulans  D.L.Jones  (NSW) – Blue Mountains midge orchid
Genoplesium superbum  D.L.Jones (NSW) – pink midge orchid
Genoplesium systenum  D.L.Jones  (NSW) – Kangarooby midge orchid
Genoplesium tasmanicum  D.L.Jones  (Tas) – Tasmanian midge orchid
Genoplesium tectum  D.L.Jones  (Qld) – Cardwell midge orchid
Genoplesium turfosum D.L.Jones  (NSW) – alpine midge orchid
Genoplesium validum  D.L.Jones (Qld) – Blackdown midge orchid
Genoplesium vernale  D.L.Jones  (NSW) – spring midge orchid
Genoplesium woollsii  (F.Muell.) D.L.Jones & M.A.Clem. (NSW) – dark midge orchid

See also
 List of Orchidaceae genera

References

External links

 
Diurideae genera